Merrill Emmett Noble (December 5, 1896 – November 13, 1969) was a justice of the New Mexico Supreme Court from August 1, 1960 until his death on November 13, 1969.

Born in Savoy, Illinois to James Houston and Harriett (Baird) Noble, Noble received an LL.B. from the University of Illinois in 1920.

In 1960, Governor John Burroughs appointed Noble to succeed the retiring James B. McGhee. Noble, who was then practicing law in Las Vegas, "received the support of the legal community in Santa Fe and the north", and was confirmed without controversy.

Noble immediately had to run for reelection to the seat, despite an initial determination by the attorney general that he would not have to run until 1962, the Supreme Court ruled that Noble's name should appear on the ballot for the election in that year. Noble won the election to the remaining two years of the previous term, and was subsequently re-elected in 1962, where he "proved to be an active campaigner", visiting by his own assessment "every town in the state".

References

Justices of the New Mexico Supreme Court
1896 births
1969 deaths
University of Illinois alumni
People from Savoy, Illinois
20th-century American judges